This article provides the Mackerras pendulum following the 2011 New South Wales state election:

For the pendulum immediately before the 2015 election, see Pre-election pendulum for the New South Wales state election, 2015.

Legislative Assembly

Pendulum
 
The current New South Wales pendulum:

Legislative Council

Current balance

References

Pendulums for New South Wales state elections